The 1969–70 Indiana Pacers season was Indiana's third season in the ABA and third as a team. The Pacers finished first in the Eastern Division and won their first ABA title.

In the Eastern Division semifinals, the Pacers swept the Carolina Cougars in four games. In the Eastern Division finals, the Pacers eliminated their archrival, the Kentucky Colonels, in five games. The Western Division champion Los Angeles Stars appeared in the ABA Championships for the first time and were defeated by the Pacers in six games.

Offseason

ABA Draft

Regular season

Schedule

Roster
 Roger Brown, F (Starter)
 Bob Netolicky, F (Starter)
 Mel Daniels, C (Starter)
 Freddie Lewis, G (Starter)
 John Barnhill, G (Starter)
 Arthur Becker, F
 Bill Keller, G
 Barry Orms, G
 Tom Thacker, G
 Stephen Chubin, G
 Ollie Darden, F
 John Fairchild, F
 Jay Miller, F
 Bobby Edmonds, F
 Dick Grubar, G
 Jerry McKee, G

Season standings

Awards, records, and honors
 1970 ABA All-Star Game
 Roger Brown
 Mel Daniels
 Freddie Lewis
 Bob Netolicky

Player stats
Note: GP= Games played; REB= Rebounds; AST= Assists; STL = Steals; BLK = Blocks; PTS = Points; AVG = Average

Transactions

Playoffs
Eastern Division Semifinals vs Carolina Cougars

Pacers win series, 4–0

Eastern Division Finals vs Kentucky Colonels

Pacers win series, 4–1

ABA Finals vs Los Angeles Stars

Pacers win series 4–2

References

 Pacers on Basketball Reference

External links
 RememberTheABA.com 1969–70 regular season and playoff results

Indiana
American Basketball Association championship seasons
Indiana Pacers seasons
Indiana Pacers
Indiana Pacers